Denis Kolinger (born 14 January 1994) is a professional footballer who plays as a defender for Romanian Liga I side CFR Cluj, on loan from Vejle.

Club career
Kolinger was born in Malsch, Germany where his parents were working before they returned to Stankovo in Croatia when he was three months old. He started out at NK Jaska in nearby Jastrebarsko, moving on to the NK Zagreb academy at the age of 13. He went through all the ranks of the club, debuting for the senior side in the 2011/12 season, becoming a first-team regular in the following season. After NK Zagreb was relegated after the 2015/16 season, Kolinger moved to NK Lokomotiva, signing a four-year contract.

On 15 January 2021, Kolinger moved to Danish Superliga club Vejle Boldklub on a three-year deal.

International career
A Croatian youth international in U16, U17, U18 and U19 categories, Kolinger refused a call-up to the Croatia U21 national football team under Nenad Gračan in August 2014 claiming that he wanted to play for Germany, that he feels he is a German rather than a Croat and is therefore willing to take the chance and seek out German nationality, which he could since it is the country of his birth. However, in early 2015 he changed his mind, claiming that he realized it would be too hard for him to join the Germany U21 national football team and since March 2015 rejoined the Croatia U21 team.

He made his senior debut for Croatia in a May 2017 friendly match against Mexico, coming on as a 71st-minute substitute for Fran Tudor.

Honours
NK Zagreb
2. NL: 2013–14

Lokomotiva Zagreb
Croatian Cup runner-up: 2019–20

CFR Cluj
Supercupa României runner-up: 2022

References

External links

 

1994 births
Living people
Footballers from Karlsruhe
People from Jastrebarsko
German people of Croatian descent
Association football central defenders
German footballers
Croatian footballers
Croatia youth international footballers
Croatia under-21 international footballers
Croatia international footballers
NK Zagreb players
NK Lokomotiva Zagreb players
Vejle Boldklub players
CFR Cluj players
Croatian Football League players
First Football League (Croatia) players
Danish Superliga players
Liga I players
Croatian expatriate footballers
Expatriate men's footballers in Denmark
Croatian expatriate sportspeople in Denmark
Expatriate footballers in Romania
Croatian expatriate sportspeople in Romania